There is another saint Gerbold of the same name, a bishop of Bayeux from the seventh century; and a bishop of Liège (died 809)

Gerebald was bishop of Châlon-sur-Saône from 864 to 885. He is a Catholic and Orthodox saint, with feast day 12 June.

Notes

885 deaths
Bishops of Chalon-sur-Saône
9th-century Christian saints
Year of birth unknown